Shen Jun (born 5 October 1986) is a Chinese football player.

Club career
Shen is a product of Shanghai Shenhua's youth team system. He moved to Donghua University in 2004 and participated in the Chinese Collegiate Football League. Shen was signed by Chinese Super League side Shaanxi Chanba in 2009 after he graduated from university. He made his senior debut for Shaanxi on 2 August 2009, in a 2–0 defeat against Chengdu Blades. He appeared 4 times in the 2009 league season. Shen became the first choice goalkeeper of the team in the 2010 league season which he gained 27 appearances. However, he lost his position to Zhang Lie after Zhang joined Shaanxi in 2011. He followed the club to move to Guizhou in 2012.

In February 2014, Shen transferred to his youth club Shanghai Shenhua. On 27 September 2014, he made his debut for Shanghai in a 2–0 away loss against Shandong Luneng. In January 2015, he was loaned to Shanghai Shenhua's satellite team CF Crack's in the Primera Regional de la Comunidad Valenciana. He was sent to the Shenhua reserved team in 2016 and 2018.

Career statistics
Statistics accurate as of match played 31 December 2019.

Honours
Donghua University
 Chinese Collegiate Football League: 2004–05

References

External links

1986 births
Living people
Chinese footballers
Footballers from Shanghai
Beijing Renhe F.C. players
Shanghai Shenhua F.C. players
Chinese Super League players
Chinese expatriate footballers
Expatriate footballers in Spain
Chinese expatriate sportspeople in Spain
Association football goalkeepers
Donghua University alumni